Rynek  is a village in the administrative district of Gmina Grębów, within Tarnobrzeg County, Podkarpackie Voivodeship, in south-eastern Poland.

References

Rynek